Early Olympic Games allowed for individuals in a team to be from different nations.  The International Olympic Committee (IOC) now groups their results together under the mixed team designation (IOC code ZZX).  During the 1904 Summer Olympics four teams comprising international members won medals in different events.

Medalists

References

International Olympic Committee 1904 St. Louis website
IOC results database

Nations at the 1904 Summer Olympics
1904 Summer Olympics
Mixed team, 1904 Summer Olympics